A patient diary is a tool used during a clinical trial or a disease treatment to assess the patient's condition (e.g. symptom severity, quality of life) or to measure treatment compliance. An electronic patient diary registers the data in a storage device and allows for automatically monitoring the time the entry was made.

Frequent recording of symptoms using a diary helps to reduce recall bias. Electronic diaries ensure entries are made as scheduled, and not, for example, in a batch immediately before the clinic visit. 

Patient diaries are also way to find out if a patient takes the medication according to the treatment schedule, which is an important problem during clinical trials and the treatment of degenerative diseases with relatively few symptoms.

See also
 Case report form
 Electronic patient reported outcomes (ePRO)
 Patient-reported outcome

References
 Stone AA, Broderick JE, Shiffman SS, Schwartz JE. Understanding recall of weekly pain from a momentary assessment perspective: absolute agreement, between- and within-person consistency, and judged change in weekly pain, Pain, 2004;107 (1-2): 61-69 
 Tiplady B, Crompton GK, Brackenridge D. Electronic diaries for asthma, British Medical Journal, 1995; 310: 1469
 van Berge Henegouwen MT, van Driel HF, Kasteleijn-Nolst Trenite DG., A patient diary as a tool to improve medicine compliance, Pharm World Sci. 1999 Feb;21(1):21-4.
 van Gerven JM, Schoemaker RC, Jacobs LD, Reints A, Ouwersloot-van der Meij MJ, Hoedemaker HG, Cohen AF., Self-medication of a single headache episode with ketoprofen, ibuprofen or placebo, home-monitored with an electronic patient diary, Br J Clin Pharmacol. 1996 Oct;42(4):475-81.

Clinical research
Clinical data management
Quality of life
Patient
Diaries